A botanical garden is a place where plants, especially ferns, conifers and flowering plants, are grown and displayed for the purposes of research, conservation, and education. This distinguishes them from parks and pleasure gardens where plants, usually with showy flowers, are grown for public amenity only. Botanical gardens that specialize in trees are sometimes referred to as arboretums.  They are occasionally associated with zoos.

The earliest botanical gardens were founded in the late Renaissance at the University of Pisa (1543) and the University of Padua (1545) in Italy, for the study and teaching of medical botany. Many universities today have botanical gardens for student teaching and academic research, e.g. the Arnold Arboretum, Harvard University, US, the Bonn University Botanic Garden, Bonn, Germany, the Cambridge University Botanic Garden, Cambridge, England, the Hortus Botanicus, Leiden, Netherlands, and the Kraus Preserve of Ohio Wesleyan University, US.

This page lists important botanical gardens throughout the world.

A useful database cataloging the world's botanic gardens can also be found at the Botanic Gardens Conservation International (BGCI) website.  With over 800 participating botanical gardens, BGCI forms the world's largest network for plant conservation and environmental education.

Argentina

Armenia

Australia

Austria

Bangladesh

Barbados 
 Andromeda Botanic Gardens
 Hunte's Gardens

Belarus 
 Central Botanical Garden of NAS of Belarus

Belgium

Belize 
 Belize Botanic Gardens

Bermuda 
 Bermuda Botanical Gardens

Botswana 

 National Botanical Garden (Botswana), Gaborone

Brazil

Bulgaria

Cameroon 
 Limbe Botanic Garden

Canada

Cayman Islands 
Queen Elizabeth II Botanic Park

Chile

China

Colombia

Costa Rica 
 Lankester Botanical Garden

Croatia

Cuba

Czech Republic

Denmark

Dominica 
Dominica Botanical Gardens

Dominican Republic 
Dr. Rafael Ma. Moscoso National Botanical Garden

Ecuador

Egypt

Estonia

Fiji 
 Savurua Botanical Gardens
 Thurston Gardens, Suva

Finland

France

Georgia

Germany

Ghana

Gibraltar 
 Gibraltar Botanic Gardens

Guyana 
 Georgetown Botanical Gardens

Haiti 
 Jardin Botanique des Cayes

Honduras

Hungary

Iceland

India

Indonesia

Iran

Ireland

Israel

Italy

Jamaica

Japan

Kenya

Kuwait 
 Bayan Botanical Garden, Bayan Palace

Latvia

Lithuania

Malaysia

Malta 
 Argotti Botanic Gardens, Floriana

Mauritius

Myanmar 
National Kandawgyi Botanical Gardens

México

Monaco 
 Jardin Exotique de Monaco

Kyrgyzstan 
 Botanical garden named after E. Gareev of Kyrgyzstan Science Academy, Bishkek

Morocco

Myanmar 
 National Botanical Gardens, Pyin U Lwin, Mandalay Division

Netherlands

New Zealand

North Korea 

 Korea Central Botanical Garden, Pyongyang

Norway

Pakistan 

Bagh-e-Jinnah, Lahore
National Herbarium, Islamabad
Rani Bagh Arboretum, Hyderabad
Sukh Chayn Gardens, Lahore
[[Herbarium and Botanical Garden, Shah Abdul Latif University

Panama 
 Parque Municipal Summit

Paraguay 
 Botanical Garden and Zoo of Asunción, Asunción

Peru

Philippines

Poland

Portugal

Puerto Rico 
 San Juan Botanical Garden

Republic of Moldova 
 Chișinău Botanical Garden

Romania

Russia

Saint Lucia 
St. Lucia Botanical Gardens

Saint Vincent and the Grenadines 
 Botanic Gardens St. Vincent

Serbia 
 Botanical Garden Jevremovac, Belgrade

Singapore

Slovakia

Slovenia 
 University Botanic Gardens, Ljubljana

South Korea

South Africa

Spain

Sri Lanka

Sultanate Of Oman 
 Oman Botanic Garden

Sudan 
 Sudan National Botanical Garden

Sweden

Switzerland

Tahiti 
 Jardin Botanique, Papeete

Taiwan

Tonga 
 'Ene'io Botanical Garden – Vava'u

Thailand

Trinidad and Tobago

Turkey 
Atatürk Arboretum
Karaca Arboretum

Uganda 
 National Botanical Gardens (Uganda)

Ukraine

United Kingdom

United States

Uzbekistan

Venezuela 
 Centro Jardín Botánico de Mérida

Vietnam

Zimbabwe

See also 
 List of herbaria
 List of aquaria
 List of zoos
 List of tourist attractions worldwide

References

External links 
 Botanic Garden Conservation International's Garden Search Database

 List
Botanical gardens